The Cleveland Council of Independent Schools (CCIS) is a consortium of independent schools in Northeast Ohio, United States.

CCIS was incorporated in 1967 after several years of periodic meetings of the trustees and heads of four east side independent schools: Hathaway Brown, Hawken, Laurel and University School. , the council now has 20 member schools, including coed and single-sex schools, Montessori schools, and boarding schools. Its mission statement is: "CCIS serves member schools and their constituents by promoting, supporting, and enhancing the value of independent education in Northeast Ohio through the facilitation of meaningful collaboration."

Member schools
, the list of CCIS members schools is:

References

External links
Cleveland Council of Independent Schools website

Education in Cuyahoga County, Ohio
Education in Geauga County, Ohio
Education in Summit County, Ohio